Sakari Tukiainen (born 2 October 1991) is a Finnish striker who plays for Cambodian Premier League club Boeung Ket.

Club career
Tukiainen began his career with Finnish youth academy Espoo Palloseura (EPS), where he played from 1997 until 2008 when he quit the game. At EPS, Tukiainen played as a defender. He stopped playing football at the age of 17 due to lack of motivation.

After a five-year break, his friend encouraged him to play for Club Latino Español who were playing in the 7th Division in Helsinki. Club Latino Español in Helsinki who were then coached by Paraguayan Rodrigo Acosta. Acosta saw a striker in Tukiainen, and he was their best in 2013 with 30 goals.

In January 2014, he moved to neighboring club Atlantis FC, who were playing in the Finnish Kakkonen and coached by the Brazilian Alan Arruda. He started with the reserve team, but joined the first team during the preseason. His goal star continued to be brilliant in Atlantis, as during the season 2014 Tukiainen scored 40 goals in 27 games and broke Kakkonen's one-time goal, which was formerly owned by Pasi Nevanperä and Joel Pohjanpalo (33 goals).

In November 2014, Tukiainen went to a test camp at the Allsvenskan AIK, where he scored two goals in him only test game, but ended up not joining AIK. In December 2014, he was bought to Estonia, the Champions League FC Flora, one of the most successful clubs in the Estonia. He played with Flora and was also loaned to JK Tulevik Viljandi for a brief period. He signed with RoPs in 2017. RoPS already had several experienced strikers, and Tukiainen did not get to feature prominently until the end of the season. He signed with Danish club Thisted FC in January 2018. In the 2018–2019 season, he became the top scorer for that season with 10 goals, and an additional 3 in the DBU cup.

He is an avid futsal player who played both futsal and football for much of his career. He also has a rank of Second Lieutenant having served in the Finnish Army for one year.

He signed for Thisted in 2018 after they sold their top striker Mikkel Agger to Norway's Sarpsborg 08.

In March 2022, he signed with Cambodian Premier League club Boeung Ket.

References

1991 births
Living people
Finnish footballers
Finnish expatriate footballers
Esiliiga players
Meistriliiga players
Kakkonen players
Veikkausliiga players
Danish 1st Division players
FC Flora players
Viljandi JK Tulevik players
Atlantis FC players
Rovaniemen Palloseura players
Thisted FC players
HIFK Fotboll players
Association football forwards
Finnish expatriate sportspeople in Estonia
Finnish expatriate sportspeople in Denmark
Expatriate footballers in Estonia
Expatriate men's footballers in Denmark
Expatriate footballers in Cambodia
Footballers from Helsinki
Finnish expatriate sportspeople in Cambodia